Hubbard House, also known as Hubbard-Lucchelli House and Theresa Lucchelli House, is a historic home located in Brooklyn, New York. It is believed to have been built between 1825 and 1838. It was listed on the National Register of Historic Places in 2000 and later designated by the New York City Landmarks Preservation Commission on January 13, 2009.

Description and history 
The Hubbard House was constructed by Lawrence Ryder, a Gravesend carpenter-builder, for Nelly Hubbard, the daughter of a farmer of Dutch descent who married a descendant of one of the first English settlers in Gravesend. Beginning in 1850, it was leased to workers and artisans. In 1904, garment worker Vincenzo Lucchelli purchased the house with his wife and five children. In 1924, Salvati & Le Quornik designed a southern two-story hippedroofed wing which incorporated a “sleeping porch” for family members suffering from tuberculosis. Theresa Lucchelli (1902–1997) inherited the house and resided in it from the age of two until her death.

It is a small, white Dutch Colonial–style farmhouse which uses H-bent construction. It consists of two sections: a -story, one-room-deep main section with a 2-story, one-room-wide by two-room-deep wing. It is covered with pine clapboard.

See also
List of New York City Landmarks
National Register of Historic Places listings in Kings County, New York

References

External links
http://www.brooklynmuseum.org/community/blogosphere/2007/07/18/this-old-house/#more-103

Houses on the National Register of Historic Places in Brooklyn
New York City Designated Landmarks in Brooklyn
Dutch colonial architecture